The World Cultural Council is an international organization whose goals are to promote cultural values, goodwill and philanthropy among individuals. The organization founded in 1981 and based in Mexico, has held a yearly award ceremony since 1984 by granting the Albert Einstein World Award of Science, the José Vasconcelos World Award of Education, and the Leonardo da Vinci World Award of Arts to outstanding scientists, educators, and artists, who have contributed positively to the cultural enrichment of mankind. The members of the Council include several Nobel laureates.

Founding members
The founding members of the World Cultural Council are 124 distinguished personalities in such fields as the arts, biology, chemistry, physics, medicine, psychology, neuroscience, astronomy, oceanography, astrophysics, anthropology, and zoology. Some of these members are recipients of awards because of their outstanding achievements including the Nobel Prize, the National Medal of Science, the Copley Medal, the Royal Medal, the Albert Einstein Medal, the Albert Lasker Award and the Enrico Fermi Award. Some of the founders are also Foreign Members or Fellows of the Royal Society, Fellows of the American Physical Society, and the Royal Swedish Academy of Sciences.

The 124 founding members of the World Cultural Council are:

Award ceremonies

Special recognitions

Starting in 2003, the World Cultural Council issues Special Recognitions to expert researchers connected to the host of the award ceremony, and which findings have been made available to the public.

See also

 Albert Einstein World Award of Science
 Leonardo da Vinci World Award of Arts
 José Vasconcelos World Award of Education
 Lists of art awards
 List of science awards
 List of education awards

References

External links
[https://web.archive.org/web/20130318063536/http://www.consejoculturalmundial.org/awards.php Official site]

1981 establishments in Mexico
Organizations based in Mexico City
International cultural organizations
International nongovernmental organizations